Bente Træen (born 15 October 1958) is a Norwegian dentist and sexologist.

Træen was born in Oslo. She graduated as cand.odont. from the University of Oslo in 1985, and as dr. philos. in 1993. She was appointed professor in health psychology at the University of Tromsø from 2001. She has administrated several investigations on sexual habits in the Norweagian population. In 2003, she was awarded the Research Council of Norway's Award for Excellence in Communication of Science. Træen writes the weekly column Sexliv for Dagbladet supplement Magasinet.

Selected works
 (co-writer)
 (co-writer)

References

1958 births
Living people
People from Oslo in health professions
Norwegian dentists
Norwegian sexologists
Norwegian columnists
University of Oslo alumni
Academic staff of the University of Tromsø